Lord Randolph Henry Spencer-Churchill (13 February 1849 – 24 January 1895) was a British statesman. Churchill was a Tory radical and coined the term 'Tory democracy'. He inspired a generation of party managers, created the National Union of the Conservative Party, and broke new ground in modern budgetary presentations, attracting admiration and criticism from across the political spectrum. His most acerbic critics were in his own party, among his closest friends; but his disloyalty to Lord Salisbury was the beginning of the end of what could have been a glittering career.  His elder son was Winston Churchill, who wrote a biography of him in 1906.

Early life

Born at 3 Wilton Terrace, Belgravia, London, Randolph Spencer was the third son of John Spencer-Churchill, Marquess of Blandford, and his wife the Marchioness of Blandford (née Lady Frances Vane); upon John's father's death in 1857, they became the (7th) Duke of Marlborough, and the Duchess of Marlborough, respectively. As the younger son of a Marquess, Randolph had a courtesy title, and was Lord Randolph Churchill; but as a commoner was able to sit in the House of Commons.

Churchill attended Tabor's Preparatory School, Cheam, then from 1863 Eton College, where he remained until 1865. He did not stand out either at academic work or sport while at Eton; his contemporaries described him as a vivacious and rather unruly boy. Among the lifelong friendships he made at school were with Arthur Balfour and Archibald Primrose (later Lord Rosebery).

In October 1867, Churchill matriculated at Merton College, Oxford. At Oxford, Primrose – now with his own courtesy title of Lord Dalmeny – was along with Churchill a member of the Bullingdon Club, and joined him at the club's champagne-fuelled parties. Randolph was frequently in trouble with the university authorities for drunkenness, smoking in academic dress, and smashing windows at the Randolph Hotel. His rowdy behaviour was infectious, rubbing off on friends and contemporaries; he gained a reputation as an enfant terrible. He had a liking for hunting, but was also a well-read historian. He gained a second-class degree in jurisprudence and modern history in 1870.

Churchill experienced no early doubts but made many mistakes, as alluded to in Rosebery's biography. He never regretted being an early friend and admirer of the Disraelis. His behaviour was, however, the later cause of dissension in his relations with a colder, more aloof, disciplinarian Salisbury. In 1871 Churchill and his elder brother George were initiated into the rites of Freemasonry, as later his son Winston would be.

At the general election of 1874 Churchill was elected to Parliament as Conservative member for Woodstock, near the family seat of Blenheim Palace, defeating George Brodrick, a Fellow of Merton. His maiden speech, delivered in his first session, prompted compliments from William Harcourt and Benjamin Disraeli, who wrote to the Queen of Churchill's "energy and natural flow".

Churchill was a close friend of Nathan Rothschild, 1st Baron Rothschild, and received "extensive loans" from the Rothschilds. He reported on the mining industry in South Africa on their behalf, where their agent Cecil Rhodes was consolidating mining deposits which ultimately led to the creation of De Beers.

Marriage and medical condition

Lord Randolph Churchill was married at the British Embassy in Paris on 15 April 1874 to Jennie Jerome, daughter of Leonard Jerome, an American businessman. The couple had two sons:
Winston Leonard Spencer-Churchill (30 November 187424 January 1965)
John Strange "Jack" Spencer-Churchill (4 February 188023 February 1947)

In January 1875, about a month after Winston's birth, Randolph made repeated visits to Dr Oscar Clayton. He had twenty years to live, but suffered from debilitating illness, particularly in his last decade. Quinault, writing in the Oxford Dictionary of National Biography, theorises that Randolph was probably passing through the stages of secondary syphilis and then tertiary syphilis, but mentions a brain tumour and multiple sclerosis as other possible causes. Whatever the true source of this illness was, Randolph was certainly treated for syphilis, and it has been suggested that he may have been suffering from symptoms related to the mercury-based medication which was used in such cases at the time. Clayton was a society doctor and specialist in the treatment of syphilis who worked from his practice at 5 Harley Street. Robson Roose, who was the Churchills' family doctor in the 1880s, had written on syphilis as a root cause of debilitating disease, and subsequently diagnosed Randolph as suffering from it. He referred Randolph to the specialist Thomas Buzzard, but continued to prescribe potassium iodide and mercury.

According to Frank Harris, who published the allegation in his scandalous autobiography, My Life and Loves (1922–27), "Randolph had caught syphilis". He relied on a story by Louis Jennings, an associate of Randolph's who had later fallen out with him. John H. Mather of the National Churchill Library and Center called into question Harris' veracity, and offered the alternative theory of a "left side brain tumour". Mather noted that "[t]here is no indication that Lady Randolph or her sons were infected with syphilis." Additionally, author Richard M. Langworth claims that Roose never actually identified the disease that Randolph was suffering from as syphilis, instead using the term "general paralysis", which in that period "suggested not only syphilis but nervous exhaustion". Langworth also states that there is "no evidence that Roose or Buzzard treated Lord Randolph with mercury or potassium iodide", arguing that "their toxic effects, such as a distinctive grey pallor, would have been evident."

Career

The "Fourth Party"

It was not until 1878 that he came to public notice as the exponent of independent Conservatism. He made a series of furious attacks on Sir Stafford Northcote, R. A. Cross, and other prominent members of the "old gang". George Sclater-Booth (afterwards 1st Baron Basing), President of the Local Government Board, was a specific target, and the minister's County Government Bill was fiercely denounced as the "crowning dishonour to Tory principles", and the "supreme violation of political honesty". Lord Randolph's attitude, and the vituperative fluency of his invective, made him a parliamentary figure of some importance before the dissolution of the 1874 parliament, though he was not yet taken quite seriously, owing to his high-pitched hysterical laugh.

In the new parliament of 1880 he speedily began to play a more notable role. Along with Henry Drummond Wolff, John Gorst and occasionally Arthur Balfour, he made himself known as the audacious opponent of the Liberal administration and the unsparing critic of the Conservative front bench. The "fourth party", as it was nicknamed, at first did little damage to the government, but awakened the opposition from its apathy; Churchill roused the Conservatives by leading resistance to Charles Bradlaugh, the member for Northampton, who as an avowed atheist or agnostic, was prepared to take the parliamentary oath only under protest. Stafford Northcote, the Conservative leader in the Lower House, was forced to take a strong line on this difficult question by the energy of the fourth party.

The long controversy over Bradlaugh's seat showed that Lord Randolph Churchill was a parliamentary champion who added to his audacity much tactical skill and shrewdness. He continued to play a conspicuous part throughout the parliament of 1880–85, targeting William Ewart Gladstone as well as the Conservative front bench, some of whose members, particularly Sir Richard Cross and William Henry Smith, he singled out for attack when they opposed the reduced Army estimates. This would be the ostensible cause for his resignation because Salisbury failed to support his Chancellor in cabinet. They opposed his unionist politics of 'economising' by Tory tradition, making Randolph grow to hate cabinet meetings.

From the beginning of the Egyptian imbroglio Lord Randolph was emphatically opposed to almost every step taken by the government. He declared that the suppression of Urabi Pasha's rebellion was an error, and the restoration of the khedive's authority a crime. He called Gladstone the "Moloch of Midlothian", for whom torrents of blood had been shed in Africa. He was equally severe on the domestic policy of the administration, and was particularly bitter in his criticism of the Kilmainham Treaty and the rapprochement between the Gladstonians and the Parnellites.

Tory Democracy

By 1885 he had formulated the policy of progressive Conservatism which was known as "Tory Democracy". He declared that the Conservatives ought to adopt, rather than oppose, popular reforms, and to challenge the claims of the Liberals to pose as champions of the masses. His views were largely accepted by the official Conservative leaders in the treatment of the Gladstonian Representation of the People Act 1884. Lord Randolph insisted that the principle of the bill should be accepted by the opposition, and that resistance should be focused on the refusal of the government to combine with it a scheme of redistribution. The prominent, and on the whole judicious and successful, part he played in the debates on these questions, still further increased his influence with the rank and file of the Conservatives in the constituencies.

At the same time he was actively spreading his gospel of democratic Toryism in a series of platform campaigns. In 1883 and 1884 he went to the radical stronghold of Birmingham, and in the latter year took part in a Conservative garden party at Aston Manor, at which his opponents paid him the compliment of raising a serious riot. He gave constant attention to the party organisation, which had fallen into considerable disorder after 1880, and was an active promoter of the Primrose League, which owed its origin to the inspiration of one of his own “fourth party” colleagues.

Central Office and National Union
In 1884 progressive Toryism won out. At the conference of the National Union of Conservative Associations, Lord Randolph was nominated chairman, despite the opposition of the parliamentary leaders.  A split was averted by Lord Randolph's voluntary resignation which he had done his best to engineer; but the episode had confirmed his title to a leading place in the Tory ranks.

He built up Tory Democracy in the towns reinforcing the urban middle classes' part in the party, while simultaneously including a working-class element.  His unsuccessful bid for the party leadership was inextricably part of the National Union's attempt to control the party organization. It had originally been founded by Tory peers to organize propaganda to attract working men's votes, registration, choose candidates, conduct elections; associations were linked to provincial unions. Lord Randolph was not the originator but his campaign of 1884 encouraged the leadership to improve on their designs. For the first time since 1832 the Conservatives won in the majority of English boroughs in November 1885.

It was strengthened by the prominent part he played in the events immediately preceding the fall of the Liberal government in 1885; and when Hugh Childers's budget resolutions were defeated by the Conservatives, aided by about half the Parnellites, Lord Randolph Churchill's admirers were justified in proclaiming him to have been the "organiser of victory".

Secretary of State for India
In Lord Salisbury's "caretaker" cabinet of 1885, Churchill was appointed Secretary of State for India, assuming office on 24June 1885. As the price of entry he demanded that Sir Stafford Northcote be removed from the Commons, despite being the Conservative leader there. Salisbury was more than willing to concede this, and Northcote went to the Lords as the Earl of Iddlesleigh.

Despite entering office with a reputation for progressive views on India, Churchill 's tenure was, in the words of the historian and biographer R.F. Foster, 'traditionally reactionary', and many of his policies focused on exploiting, not developing India. He enthusiastically supported a trade policy which favoured British imports over Indian goods; increased spending on the Indian Army at the expense of public works such as railways, roads and irrigation (all sharply reduced under his secretaryship); and re-directed money which had been set aside for future famine relief to help balance his budget. His attitude towards the native Indians was similarly illiberal. He refused to allow reforms which would have increased Indian representation within the civil service and army, and, in a public speech at Birmingham, he infamously described a deputation to Britain by three Indian politicians, led by N. G. Chandavarkar, as the 'three Bengalee baboos'.

However, Churchill's most well-known act during his time at the India Office was his role in the invasion and annexation of Burma in the Third Anglo-Burmese War. Siding with British commercial (especially cotton) and military interests, and hoping to boost Conservative fortunes in the upcoming general election, Churchill directed the Viceroy, Lord Dufferin, to invade Upper Burma in November 1885. With little discussion, Churchill then decided to annex the Burmese kingdom, adding it as a new province of the Indian Raj as a "New Year present" for Queen Victoria on New Year's Day 1886. Not only is the war itself widely regarded as a piece of blatant imperialism, but the continuing guerrilla war lasted into the later 1880s and cost the Indian taxpayer ten times Churchill's original financial estimates.

In the autumn election of 1885 he contested Birmingham Central against John Bright, and though defeated here, was at the same time returned by a very large majority for South Paddington.

In the contest which arose over William Ewart Gladstone's Home Rule bill, Lord Randolph again bore a conspicuous part, and in the electioneering campaign his activity was only second to that of some of the Liberal Unionists, Lord Hartington, George Goschen and Joseph Chamberlain. He was now the recognised Conservative champion in the Lower Chamber, and when the second Salisbury administration was formed after the general election of 1886 he became Chancellor of the Exchequer and Leader of the House of Commons.

End of political career

Churchill was new to the leadership ranks, and became a relatively isolated figure in the cabinet. He did not think in terms of consulting his supporters and building a base in Commons; instead, he decided to use his strong public support to impose his positions on the Prime Minister in both domestic and foreign affairs. He decided to demonstrate to the public that the Conservatives could be as economical in budgetary matters as Gladstone had been. Therefore, he proposed a budget with significant expenditure reductions that surprised and annoyed the Conservative MPs. They were willing to compromise, but he insisted on additional cuts in the Army and Navy that alarmed the service ministers. Churchill decided to threaten resignation but it proved to be one of the great blunders in British political history. In his resignation letter he stated that it was because he was unable as Chancellor to support the armed services. He expected his resignation to be followed by the unconditional surrender of the cabinet, and his restoration to office on his own terms. Instead, Salisbury accepted the resignation, and Churchill was out in the cold. Goschen replaced him as Chancellor. For the next few years there was some speculation about a return to front-line politics, but Churchill's own career was over. Even so, his economising ideas survived yet in the "Dartford Programme" of September 1886.

Although Lord Randolph continued to sit in Parliament, his health was in serious decline throughout the 1890s. He was an ardent patron of horse racing; in 1889, his horse, L'Abbesse de Jouarre, won The Oaks. In 1891 he went to South Africa, in search both of health and relaxation. He travelled for some months through Cape Colony, the Transvaal and Rhodesia, making notes on the politics and economics of the countries, shooting lions, and recording his impressions in letters to a London newspaper, which were afterwards republished under the title of Men, Mines and Animals in South Africa. He attacked Gladstone's Second Home Rule Bill with energy, and gave fiery pro-Union speeches in Ireland. During this time he coined the phrase "Ulster will fight, and Ulster will be right", echoing his earlier remark that in opposing Irish Home Rule "the Orange card would be the one to play".

It was soon apparent that Churchill's powers had been undermined by the illness which was to take his life at the age of 45. As the session of 1893 wore on, his speeches lost their old effectiveness. His last speech in the House was delivered in the debate on the East African Scheme in June 1894, and was a painful failure.

Death
An attempted round-the-world journey failed to cure Lord Randolph of his debilitating illness. He started in the autumn of 1894, accompanied by his wife, but his health soon became so feeble that he was brought back hurriedly from Cairo. He reached England shortly before Christmas, and died in Westminster the next month. The gross value of his personal estate was entered in the Probate Registry at £75,971. He is buried near his wife and sons at St Martin's Church, Bladon, near Woodstock, Oxfordshire.

His widow, Lady Randolph Churchill, married George Cornwallis-West in 1900, when she became known as Mrs. George Cornwallis-West.  After that marriage was dissolved, she resumed by deed poll her prior married name, Lady Randolph Churchill. (Lord Randolph was her husband's courtesy title as the younger son of a duke and in English law does not qualify as a noble title in its own right.) Lord Randolph's son, Sir Winston Churchill, died on 24 January 1965, aged 90, exactly 70 years after the death of his father, having lived twice as long.

Personality and reputation

Rosebery described his old friend and political opponent, after his death, thus: "his nervous system was always tense and highly strung; ...he seems to have had no knowledge  of men, no consideration of their feelings, no give and take."  But he continued, "in congenial society, his conversation was wholly delightful. He would then display his mastery of pleasant irony and banter; for with those playthings he was at his best."

Biographer Roy Jenkins, pointing to his brash and slightly vulgar charisma, asked, "Was he ever near to being a serious statesman?":

Undoubtedly, he had some high political talents. He had a gift for mordant, wounding, sometimes very funny phrases. And, having thought up the most outrageous attack he had the nerve to deliver it, without fear of offending taste or friends or damaging his own repute....He was strong on insolence. He also had other attributes necessary to make his words resound, and his fame increase: a mnemonic name, an  idiosyncratic appearance, and good delivery, whether on the platform or in the House of Commons. In addition he had sporadic charm, although intermingled with offensive and often pointless rudeness.

Jenkins compares his youth to that of William Pitt the Younger: "Pitt was Prime Minister for 19 of his 46 years. Churchill had 11 months in office and was without rival in attracting so much attention and achieving so little."

Film, television and literary depictions
In the ITV historical drama series Edward the Seventh, Lord Randolph (played by Derek Fowlds) is featured as a more natural character, sociably similar to Albert Edward, Prince of Wales and his other friends. His downfall is represented when he confronts Alexandra, Princess of Wales and demands she use her influence with the Prince to stop Lord Aylesford proceeding with a divorce from his wife, Lady Aylesford, after she had planned to elope with Lord Randolph's elder brother, the Marquess of Blandford. He threatens to expose letters from the Prince to Lady Aylesford, so scandalous, so he says, that if they were to be exposed, "the Prince of Wales would never sit on the throne of England."

Outraged, the Princess goes to see the Queen, who is equally indignant. Prime Minister Benjamin Disraeli informs the Prince, who is so angry that he challenges Lord Randolph to a duel in the South of France. Eventually, Lord Aylesford does not attempt to seek a divorce from his wife, and Lord Blandford does not elope with Lady Aylesford. Lord Randolph sends a note of apology to the Prince, which is merely acknowledged. Disgraced, Lord Randolph and his wife leave for America.

Other notable appearances include the film Young Winston, in which he was portrayed by Robert Shaw, and the miniseries Jennie: Lady Randolph Churchill, in which he was portrayed by actor Ronald Pickup, as the English aristocrat who falls in love with the daughter of an American billionaire property developer.

Sir Winston referred to his father's career in several of the last chapters of A History of the English-Speaking Peoples written in Winston's 'wilderness years' in the inter-war years before he was recalled to the cabinet.

Fiction
 The alternate history novel Fight and Be Right (by Ed Thomas), traces Churchill's further political rise in a world where his brother, the Marquess of Blandford, loses the scandalous letter between the Prince of Wales and Lady Aylesford, resulting in their father, the Duke of Marlborough, not being promoted to Lord Lieutenant of Ireland, and Randolph free of the scandal from the affair to rise further through the party ranks and become Prime Minister.

See also

 Edward the Seventh

Notes

References

Sources

Primary sources

 Volume I Full text at Archive.org
 Volume II Full text at Archive.org

Secondary sources

 James, Robert Rhodes. "Lord Randolph Churchill" History Today (Mar 1955) 5#3 pp 145–153, short biography.

Archives
 Lord Randolph Churchill (University Library, Cambridge)

External links
Our Infant Hercules – Westminster Victorian Cartoonists – UK Parliament Living Heritage

1849 births
1895 deaths
Leaders of the House of Commons of the United Kingdom
Burials at St Martin's Church, Bladon
Randolph Churchill
Leaders of the Conservative Party (UK)
Chancellors of the Exchequer of the United Kingdom
British Secretaries of State
Conservative Party (UK) MPs for English constituencies
People educated at Cheam School
People educated at Eton College
UK MPs 1874–1880
UK MPs 1880–1885
UK MPs 1885–1886
UK MPs 1886–1892
UK MPs 1892–1895
Alumni of Merton College, Oxford
Younger sons of dukes
Deaths from syphilis
Members of the Privy Council of the United Kingdom
Freemasons of the United Grand Lodge of England
Parents of prime ministers of the United Kingdom
Bullingdon Club members